Grus is a genus of large birds in the crane family.

The genus Grus was erected by the French zoologist Mathurin Jacques Brisson in 1760. The name Grus is the Latin word for "crane". The German ornithologist Peter Simon Pallas was sometimes credited with erecting the genus in 1766 but the International Commission on Zoological Nomenclature ruled in 1956 that Brisson should have priority.

The genus formerly included additional species. A molecular phylogenetic study published in 2010 found that the genus Grus, as then defined, was polyphyletic. In the resulting rearrangement to create monophyletic genera, the sandhill crane, the white-naped crane, the sarus crane and the brolga were moved to the resurrected genus Antigone that had been erected by the German naturalist Ludwig Reichenbach in 1853. The Siberian crane was moved to the resurrected monotypic genus Leucogeranus.

Species
The genus contains eight species:

    
The HBW/BirdLife and Clements checklists place the demoiselle crane and blue crane in the genus Anthropoides, and the wattled crane in the monospecific genus Bugeranus, leaving only the red-crowned, whooping, common, hooded, and black-necked cranes in the genus Grus.

The Cuban flightless crane, Grus cubensis, became extinct in the Pleistocene.

Fossil record
The fossil record of the genus stretches back some 12 million years or so. A considerable number of prehistoric species are known, with the oldest, Grus miocaenicus (Middle Miocene of Credinţa, Romania) perhaps not a crane but a junior synonym of the swimming-flamingo Palaelodus ambiguus; ("Grus" problematica certainly is). The Late Pleistocene Mediterranean Grus primigenia was hunted by Stone Age humans.

 Grus afghana (Late Miocene of Molayan, Afghanistan) - doubtfully distinct from G. penteleci
Grus sp. 1 (Late Miocene of Love Bone Bed, USA)
Grus sp. 2  (Late Miocene of Love Bone Bed, USA)
Grus cf. antigone (Late Miocene/Early Pliocene of Lee Creek Mine, USA)
Grus nannodes (Late Miocene/Early Pliocene -? Edson Middle Pliocene of Sherman County, USA)
Grus sp. (Late Miocene/Early Pliocene of Lee Creek Mine, USA)
Grus haydeni (Late Miocene/Early Pliocene - Pleistocene? of WC USA) - 2 species, one may be same as G. canadensis
Grus penteleci (Late Miocene - Early Pliocene of C and SE Europe) - formerly in Pliogrus
Grus sp. (Late Pliocene of Puebla de Valverde, Spain)
Grus bogatshevi (Late Pleistocene of Azerbaijan) - doubtfully distinct form G. primigenia
Grus latipes (Shore Hills Late Pleistocene of Bermuda, W Atlantic) - formerly Baeopteryx
Maltese crane Grus melitensis (Late Pleistocene of Malta) - doubtfully distinct from G. primigenia
Grus pagei (Late Pleistocene of Rancho La Brea)
Grus primigenia (Late Pleistocene? of SW Europe)
Grus cubensis (Pleistocene and Holocene of Cuba)

Several other fossil gruiforms are now considered not to belong here. "Grus" prentici is now in Paragrus, "Grus" princeps, "Grus" excelsa and "Grus" hordwellianus are placed in Palaeogrus, and "Grus" excelsa in Balearica. "Grus" marshi belongs in Aletornis.

More uncertain is the position of Probalearica (variously considered Late Oligocene to Middle Pliocene but probably Late Miocene) from Golboçica (Moldavia) and maybe elsewhere. It is usually regarded a nomen dubium but might belong into Grus. "Grus" conferta (Late Miocene/Early Pliocene of Contra Costa County, USA) is apparently too different from the modern genus to be placed herein, but its affiliations are not well resolved.

References

 
 

 
Bird genera